Lizzie Broughton (born 5 March 1988) is a British sprint canoeist. She competes primarily in canoe marathon, a sport in which she has won several international medals (including K-1 silver at the 2014 World Championships).

In recent years she has also enjoyed success in canoe sprint, including gold and silver medals in the 2018 World Championships.

References

External links

1988 births
Living people
British female canoeists
ICF Canoe Sprint World Championships medalists in kayak